Peter J. Strzelecki (born October 24, 1994) is an American professional baseball pitcher for the Milwaukee Brewers of Major League Baseball (MLB). He made his MLB debut in 2022.

Career
Strzelecki played college baseball at the University of South Florida. He was signed as an undrafted free agent by the Milwaukee Brewers after the 2018 Major League Baseball draft. In his first professional season, he played for the Arizona League Brewers and the Helena Brewers while pitching to a cumulative 5.52 earned run average (ERA) in  innings pitched. He played for the Wisconsin Timber Rattlers and the Carolina Mudcats in 2019 and recorded a 3.05 ERA in 59 innings. He did not play a minor league game in 2020 as the season was cancelled due to the COVID-19 pandemic. Returning for the 2021 minor league season, he pitched for the Biloxi Shuckers and the Nashville Sounds. Between the two teams, he pitched in 40 games and went 0–2 with a 3.46 ERA. He began the 2022 season with Nashville before having his contract selected to the major league roster by the Brewers on May 30, 2022. He made his MLB debut on June 2, 2022.

Personal life
Strzelecki grew up in Boynton Beach, Florida with two brothers and one sister. He started playing baseball at a young age and later on because a dual sport athlete playing high school basketball and football as well.

While Strzelecki was pitching at South Florida, his father, Kevin, died of a heart attack at age 52.

References

External links

 South Florida Bulls bio

1994 births
Living people
Sportspeople from Queens, New York
Baseball players from New York City
Major League Baseball pitchers
Milwaukee Brewers players
South Florida Bulls baseball players
Arizona League Brewers players
Helena Brewers players
Carolina Mudcats players
Wisconsin Timber Rattlers players
Biloxi Shuckers players
Nashville Sounds players
Palm Beach State Panthers baseball players